The Kamalō Sugar Plantation (also: Kamaloo, Kamalo) was a sugarcane plantation and mill located in Kamalō, Molokai, Kingdom of Hawaii. It was the oldest sugar plantation and mill established on Molokai and ceased operations before the 1906 founding of the California and Hawaiian Sugar Company.

History

The Kamalō Sugar Plantation was founded by Irish-born businessman John C. McColgan (1814-1890) in 1873. In July of that year, he was reported to have leased a 4,000-acre tract of land from the late King Kamehameha V's estate that was located between Kaunakakai and Kalua‘aha. The mill and plantation were managed by McColgan's cousins, the Irish-born brothers Hugh McCorriston (1836-1926) and Daniel McCorriston (1840-1927).

The mill equipment for the Kamalō Sugar Plantation was the same as used at McColgan's sugarcane plantation located in Waiau, O‘ahu. 

The Kamalō Sugar Plantation began exporting sugar to California in the 1880s, with a reported shipment of 353 bags aboard the SS Mariposa (1883) in September 1884.

Upon McColgan's death in 1890, ownership of the Kamalō Sugar Plantation passed in part to the McCorriston brothers.

The Fire of 1891

On August 7, 1891, the Kamalō Sugar Plantation burned to the ground due to unknown causes. The mill and plantation were insured for $25,000, and cattle turned onto the land for ranching.

Revival
In 1897, the McCorriston brothers began discussing reviving the Kamalō Sugar Plantation. In 1899, the brothers sold their land to Frank Hustace, J.J. Egan, and Hugh's stepson Frank Hudson Foster, who incorporated under the name Kamalō Sugar Company, Limited.

Notes

References

 Molokai
 Sugar plantations in Hawaii
 Pre-statehood history of Hawaii
1873 establishments in Hawaii
1890s disestablishments in Hawaii